Thomas O’Brien, Tom O’Brien, or Tommy O'Brien may refer to:

Politicians
Thomas C. O'Brien (1887–1951), American politician and lawyer
Thomas J. O'Brien (Illinois politician) (1878–1964), Illinois politician
Thomas J. O'Brien (Massachusetts politician) (contemporary), Massachusetts State Representative
Thomas J. O'Brien (Michigan politician) (1842–1933), Michigan politician and U.S. ambassador
Thomas P. O'Brien (born 1960), former United States Attorney for the Central District of California
Sir Tom O'Brien (trade unionist) (1900–1970), British trade unionist and Member of Parliament

Sportspeople
Thomas O'Brien (footballer) (born 1991), Scottish footballer
Tom O'Brien (American football) (born 1948), former American college football coach at NC State
Tom O'Brien (footballer, born 1889) (1889–1963), Australian rules footballer for University
Tom O'Brien (footballer, born 1904) (1904–1983), Australian rules footballer for Melbourne
Tom O'Brien (jockey) (born 1986), Irish jockey
Tom O'Brien (outfielder) (1873–1901), Major League Baseball outfielder/infielder
Tom O'Brien (second baseman) (1860–1921), baseball player
Tommy O'Brien (baseball) (1918–1978), Major League Baseball outfielder
Tommy O'Brien (rugby union), Irish rugby union player
Tommy O'Brien (basketball), American basketball player

Others
Thomas O'Brien (bishop) (1792–1874), Church of Ireland Bishop of Ossory, Ferns, and Leighlin
Thomas O'Brien (interior designer) (born 1961), American designer
Thomas D. O'Brien (1859–1935), co-founder of William Mitchell College of Law
Thomas J. O'Brien (bishop) (1935-2018), Bishop of Phoenix, 1982–2003
Thomas W. O'Brien (1859–1916), Canadian entrepreneur and pioneer
Thomas Alexander O'Brien (1888–1948), New Zealand cinema owner and entrepreneur
 Tom O'Brien (actor, born 1890) (1890-1947), American film actor
Tom O'Brien (actor) (born 1965), American film actor
Tom O'Brien (swindler) (1851–1904), American confidence man and swindler